The High Sheriff of Leitrim was the British Crown's judicial representative in County Leitrim, Ireland from c.1582 until 1922, when the office was abolished in the new Free State and replaced by the office of Leitrim County Sheriff. The sheriff had judicial, electoral, ceremonial and administrative functions and executed High Court Writs. In 1908, an Order in Council made the Lord-Lieutenant the Sovereign's prime representative in a county and reduced the High Sheriff's precedence. However the sheriff retained his responsibilities for the preservation of law and order in the county. The usual procedure for appointing the sheriff from 1660 onwards was that three persons were nominated at the beginning of each year from the county and the Lord Lieutenant then appointed his choice as High Sheriff for the remainder of the year. Often the other nominees were appointed as under-sheriffs. Sometimes a sheriff did not fulfil his entire term through death or other event and another sheriff was then appointed for the remainder of the year. The dates given hereunder are the dates of appointment. All addresses are in County Leitrim unless stated otherwise.

County Leitrim was created in 1569

High Sheriffs of County Leitrim

1582: O'Rourke (Annals of Loch Cé 1582- Another depredation was committed by the sheriff O'Ruairc, and by the Saxons along with him, upon the sons of Mac Tighernain of the Breifne, at Loch-Roda; and their women were borne off captives from them)
1605: Sir Ralph Sidley
1606: Cola O'Kelly
1609: William Farrell
1613: John Reynolds of Loughscur Castle
1620: Humphrey Reynolds of Loughscur Castle
1621: Humphrey Reynolds of Loughscur Castle
1623: Humphrey Reynolds of Loughscur Castle
1624: Henry Crofton of Mohill
1639: John Blundell of Port
1640: John Blundell of Port
1641: Con O'Rourke of Castlecar, Manorhamilton
1642: Con O'Rourke of Castlecar, Manorhamilton
1645: James Ringe
1655: Sir George St. George, Carrick-on-Shannon
1656: Robert Parke, Newtown Castle, Dromahair
1657: James King, Charlestown, Co. Roscommon
1658: Edward Crofton
1659: Owen Wynn of Lurganboy
1663: Owen Wynn of Lurganboy
1682: Walter Jones of Dublin
1686: James Wynne of Lurganboy
1688: William Jones of Headfort
1689: Hugh O'Rorke of Clooncorrick
1698: Thomas Crofton
1699: William Lawder of Bonnybeg

18th century

19th century

20th century

References

 
Leitrim
History of County Leitrim